Count Franz Oliver von Jenison-Walworth (9 June 1787 – 20 May 1867) was a Bavarian politician and diplomat.

Early life
He was the only surviving son of the  Count Franz von Jenison-Walworth and, his first wife, Baroness Charlotte von Cornet (1766–1864). His parents divorced and his father married Mary Beauclerk in 1797. From his father's marriage to Mary (daughter of Topham Beauclerk and Lady Diana Spencer), he had four half-sisters and a half-brother, including Countess Emilie von Jenison-Walworth (wife of Count Karl Heinrich Alban von Schönburg-Forderglauchau) and Karl Friedrich von Jenison-Walworth (who married Jeromia Katharina von Schönburg-Forderglauchau and Ellen Mitchell).

His paternal grandfather was Baron von Cornet. His paternal grandparents were Count Francis Jenison of Walworth and the former Charlotte Smith, who were English born landowners who relocated to Heidelberg.

Career
Franz began his diplomatic career at the age of 23 as a Bavarian legation secretary in Berlin. In 1811 he was transferred to St. Petersburg where he again served as legation secretary, then on to Paris in 1813 and London in 1814. After the departure of Johann Casimir Häffelin as Maximilian I Joseph's Bavarian envoy for Naples, he became chargé d'affaires for Naples in 1816, residing in Rome. He held the post until 1821 when he reported to the Bavarian government about the impressions that the promulgation of the Bavarian constitutional document to the Roman Curia of 1818. In 1824, the same year he was married, he was appointed Bavarian Envoy to the United Kingdom of the Netherlands at The Hague. He was recalled in the spring of 1826 and temporarily retired.

From 1833 to 1847, during the reign of King Ludwig I he served, successively, as the Bavarian Envoy to the most important courts in Europe. He was appointed the Bavatian Minister to the Court of St. James in London, from 1833 to 1835 (a position his father had held in 1793 as Envoy for Hesse-Darmstadt), then Envoy in Paris from 1835 to 1839, before becoming the Envoy in St. Petersburg from 1840 to 1842. In February 1843, he attended at dinner at Gloucester House held by the Princess Alice, Duchess of Gloucester. His last assignment was the Envoy in Vienna from 1843 to 1874. Upon his retirement in 1847, he moved to Italy, where he spent the rest of his life.

Personal life
In 1824, he married Countess Amalia Batthyány, daughter of Count József Sándor Batthyány von Német-Újvár and Borbála Skerlecz de Lomnicza. She was also the older sister of Count Lajos Batthyány, the first Prime Minister of Hungary. They divorced and she married his cousin, Count Karl Theodor von Westerholt (son of Count Alexander von Westerholt), in 1831. 

Count von Jenison-Walworth died in Florence on 20 May 1867.

References
Notes

Sources

1787 births
1867 deaths
Counts of Jenison-Walworth
19th-century diplomats
Jenison-Walworth
Jenison-Walworth
Jenison-Walworth
Jenison-Walworth
Jenison-Walworth
Jenison-Walworth
Jenison-Walworth